Wolf at the Door is an album by the American blues musician Walter "Wolfman" Washington, released in 1991.

Production
The album was produced by Scott Billington. It was recorded with Washington's Roadmasters band.

Critical reception

The Washington Post wrote that "Washington broadens the blues focus of his first two solo albums to include pop-jazz and Southern soul numbers ... he's singing better than ever and he plays guitar with a welcome new restraint." USA Today thought that "the venerable singer/guitarist and his ace Roadmasters are impressively flexible, brewing up le bon temps with jazz ('Peepin'), gospel ('It Doesn't Really Matter') and blues ('Tailspin')." 

Living Blues called the album Washington's "most assured ever," writing that he sings "Hello Stranger" "with real expression, adding pithy guitar commentary that negates the triviality of synthesizer harmonies and George Bensonesque verbal shtick." The Journal of American Folklore deemed Washington "New Orleans' premier contemporary bluesman," writing that "his own haunting love ballad 'Don't Say Goodbye' is the most distinctive piece on the record."

AllMusic thought that "the horn arrangements look back toward 1960s Motown, and five of the six tracks fall squarely into the idiom of pre-disco R&B, with touches of funk and gospel." The Rolling Stone Album Guide called Wolf at the Door Washington's "strongest" album, writing that "the brass arrangements, in particular, are stunning."

Track listing

Personnel
Wilbert Arnold - drums
Jack Cruz - bass
David Ellington - piano
Tom Fitzpatrick - saxophone
George Jackson, Jr. - percussion
Walter "Wolfman" Washington - guitar, vocals

References

1991 albums
Rounder Records albums